Žarko Kujundžiski (Or: Zarko Kujundziski) (born May 19, 1980 in Skopje,) is a North Macedonian novelist and playwright.

Career 
He earned a bachelor's degree in 2003 at the Faculty of Philology "Blaže Koneski" in Skopje. In 2009 he has defended his master's degree thesis "Aspects of microfiction in the American and the Macedonian literature", as a first longer study in the world on the subject of microfiction.

Kujundžiski belongs among youngest generation of writers in Macedonia. He has published the books Spectator (2003), Andrew, Love, and Other Disasters (three plays from 2004), America (2006), Found and Lost (2008), 13 (a collection of short stories from 2010), My Susan Again Girl (2010) and The Shortest Long (2012). He is the editor of the I Have A Dream anthology, a Macedonian-language collection of notable speeches from around the world.

He has translated the novel Breakfast at Tiffany's by Truman Capote and, together with Zlatko Kujundziski, the script of Pulp Fiction, from English into Macedonian.

External links
Related Article
Related Article
Related Article

1980 births
Living people
Writers from Skopje